Pippi in the South Seas (original Swedish title: Pippi Långstrump på de sju haven) is a 1970 Swedish/West German movie, loosely based on the eponymous children's book by Astrid Lindgren and sequel of the 1969 TV series Pippi Longstocking. The movie was followed by Pippi on the Run, released later in the same year. It was released in the US in 1974.

Synopsis

Pippi, with friends Tommy and Annika, adventures on the South Seas to hunt for her father, who has been kidnapped by pirates.

Cast 
 Inger Nilsson-Pippi Longstocking
 Maria Persson-Narrator/Annika
 Pär Sundberg-Tommy
 Beppe Wolgers-Captain Efraim Longstocking
 Martin Ljung-Jocke with the Knife
 Jarl Borssén-Blood-Svente
 Öllegård Wellton-Annika's and Tommy's Mother
 Fredrik Ohlsson-Annika's and Tommy's Father
 Staffan Hallerstam-Marko
 Tor Isedal-Pedro
 Håkan Serner-Franco
 Alfred Schieske-Pirate
 Wolfgang Völz-Oscar
 Nikolaus Schilling-Pirate
 Olle Nordemar-Pirate
 Gunnar Lantz-Pirate
 Carl Schwartz-Pirate
 Per Bakke-Pirate
 Kelvin Leonard-Pirate
 Ingemar Claesson-Pirate
 Olle Nyman-Pirate
 Nibbe Malmqvist-Pirate
 Åke Hartwig-Pirate
 Thor Heyerdahl-Pirate
 Arne Ragneborn-Pirate
 Douglas-Rosalinda(parrot)

References

External links
 Pippi in the South Seas on Swedish Film Database
 
 

1970 films
1970s adventure comedy films
Swedish adventure comedy films
West German films
Pirate films
Films directed by Olle Hellbom
Films set in Sweden
Films set in Oceania
Films based on Pippi Longstocking
1970 comedy films
1970s Swedish films